Dransfieldia is a monotypic genus of flowering plant in the palm family from western New Guinea where the lone species Dransfieldia micrantha grows in dense rain forest. Discovered in 1872, 134 years passed before DNA testing revealed its proper placement. With no close relatives, it is a delicate, pinnate-leaved palm named after John Dransfield, former palm expert at the Kew Royal Botanic Gardens.

Description 
The thin trunk is solitary, gray to maroon in color, with distinct, widely spaced leaf scar rings.  The leaf sheaths are extended, forming a distinct green crownshaft; the small rachis bears widely spaced, acute leaflets, slightly offset and taper to a point.  The inflorescence is borne beneath the crownshaft, protected by a caducous prohyll, once-branched, producing one-seeded fruit with apical remains.

Taxonomy 
Odoardo Beccari first collected the palm in Indonesian New Guinea in 1872 assigning it to the genus Ptychosperma under the epithet micranthum, Latin for "small flower".  The leaf tips were not jagged like most in the genus and, eleven years later, was moved to Rhopaloblaste by Sir Joseph Hooker, then director of the Kew gardens.  The fit was imperfect as the male flowers and seedling eophylls in Rhopaloblaste did not match.  In 1970, palm scientist Harold E. Moore analyzed Beccari's collection, and despite bearing a crownshaft, reclassified it as a member of Heterospathe, a non-crownshafted genus.  Finally, in 2006, DNA tests revealed the plant matched no known genera; it was named for John Dransfield by his contemporaries to honor his long study of the family.

Distribution and habitat 
They are restricted to western New Guinea rain forest undergrowth, with high humidity and frequent rainfall.

References

External links 
 Dransfieldia on NPGS/GRIN
 Fairchild Guide to Palms: Dransfieldia
 Fairchild images
 Kew:Dransfieldia
 Lundkvist Palm Garden

Areceae
Monotypic Arecaceae genera
Endemic flora of New Guinea
Taxa named by Odoardo Beccari